Army Medical College, Chattogram  (AMCC) is a military medical college, established in 2014. It is located in Chattogram Cantonment, Bangladesh. It is affiliated with Bangladesh University of Professionals. The college started its academic journey on 11 January 2015 with 50 students and 13 faculty members.

It offers a five-year course of study leading to a Bachelor of Medicine, Bachelor of Surgery (MBBS) degree. A one-year internship after graduation is compulsory for all graduates. The degree is recognised by the Bangladesh Medical and Dental Council.

Currently it has 5 batches with 50 students per batch.

Every year only 50 students get chance to admit in this college.

Controlling authority   
The controlling authority of Army Medical College Chattogram  is shown below:

Ministry of Defence (Bangladesh) 
Army Headquarters
Bangladesh University of Professionals(BUP)
Bangladesh Medical and Dental Council(BM&DC)

Campus
Location for Permanent College Campus has been selected near Military Farm. It has no permanent campus yet. Its temporary campus is inside Chittagong Combined Military Hospital (CMH). Classes are held inside tin shed rooms. It has four lecture galleries equipped with all modern teaching aids (of which two gallery is air conditioned). It has a dissection hall with attached preservation room,  has a histology room and has a museum for the department of Anatomy. In addition it has well furnished laboratories for all other pre-clinical & para-clinical departments. Every department has its own tutorial room. It has enough histology slides, cadavers, viscera and models in the department of Anatomy. Ward placement for the clinical years is held in Chittagong CMH. Medicine & Surgery wards of Chittagong CMH are now affiliated by BCPS and affiliation of BCPS for Gynae & Obstetrics ward, Eye & ENT ward are under process. Autopsy classes are held in Chittagong Medical College under special considerations.

Appearance in professional examinations

First batch of this institution appeared 1st professional MBBS examination held in May 2016. They achieved tremendous success. They secured three places - 1st (Shakib Bin Mohiuddin), 2nd (Fahmida Ferdous) and 9th (Mishkat Misho).

Games and sports
  
Facilities  for  following  games and  sports  are available:
   
(1)  Football

(2) Volleyball

(3) Badminton

(4) Table  tennis

(5) Cricket

(6) Chess

Dormitory facilities
Army  Medical  College Chattogram is a  residential  institution.

References

Medical colleges in Bangladesh
Hospitals in Chittagong
Educational institutions established in 2014
2014 establishments in Bangladesh
Military education and training in Bangladesh